Klarobelia megalocarpa is a species of flowering plants in the family Annonaceae. It is endemic to Ecuador. Its natural habitat is subtropical or tropical moist lowland forests. It is threatened by habitat loss.

References

Endemic flora of Ecuador
megalocarpa
Endangered plants
Taxonomy articles created by Polbot